Victor John Stasiuk (born May 23, 1929) is a Canadian former professional ice hockey left winger and a former NHL head coach.

Biography
Stasiuk played junior hockey in his native Lethbridge, Alberta before signing with the Chicago Black Hawks. He played sparingly in Chicago, and was traded to the Detroit Red Wings in 1951. He spent time in the minors with the Indianapolis Capitals and the Edmonton Flyers. He was part of three Stanley Cup teams in 1952, 1954, and 1955. In 1954, however, although Stasiuk played 42 regular season games for Detroit, because he spent the playoffs in the minors, his name was left off the Stanley Cup after the Wings captured the league crown.

In 1955, Stasiuk was traded to the Boston Bruins and found chemistry with Johnny Bucyk and Bronco Horvath, a grouping dubbed "The Uke line" because of the Ukrainian ancestry of the three players. In 1957-58, this line became the first in NHL history to have all three participants reach the 20 goal mark. In 1960, Stasiuk scored a career high 68 points, and he was selected to play in the NHL All-Star Game. In 1961, he was traded back to Detroit, playing with this club until 1963, before finishing his career in the minors. He played for the Chicago Black Hawks, Detroit Red Wings, and Boston Bruins, He recorded 183 goals and 254 assists in 745 NHL games.

After retiring, Stasiuk moved to coaching. He took over the Pittsburgh Hornets of the American Hockey League for two seasons and later led the same league's Quebec Aces to back-to-back losses in the Calder Cup finals. Immediately after coaching the EHL Jersey Devils from 1966-68, Stasiuk earned a job with the Philadelphia Flyers. His team finished out of the playoffs by a single point in 1969-70, and then were eliminated in the first round of the postseason the next year. Stasiuk was fired after the 1970-71 season; the Flyers offered him a scouting position, but he took a head coaching job three games into the NHL season with the California Golden Seals. Stasiuk was fired after the season due to a stylistic conflict with management, and he then spent one year behind the bench of the Vancouver Canucks before settling into a career in junior hockey coaching.

Career statistics

Regular season and playoffs

Coaching record

See also
List of ice hockey line nicknames

References

External links

1929 births
Boston Bruins players
California Golden Seals coaches
Canadian ice hockey coaches
Canadian ice hockey left wingers
Canadian people of Ukrainian descent
Chicago Blackhawks players
Detroit Red Wings players
Edmonton Flyers (WHL) players
Ice hockey people from Alberta
Ice hockey player-coaches
Indianapolis Capitals players
Living people
Medicine Hat Tigers coaches
Memphis Wings players
Pittsburgh Hornets players
Philadelphia Flyers coaches
Sportspeople from Lethbridge
Stanley Cup champions
Vancouver Canucks coaches